Nick Lim (born 22 July 1998) is a Dutch football player of Chinese descent who plays for Jong FC Utrecht.

Club career
He made his professional debut in the Eerste Divisie for Jong FC Utrecht on 5 August 2016 in a game against NAC Breda.

References

External links
 

1998 births
Living people
Dutch footballers
Jong FC Utrecht players
Eerste Divisie players
Association football defenders
Alphense Boys players